Nova Lipa is a village northwest of Vinica in the Municipality of Črnomelj in the White Carniola area of southeastern Slovenia. The area is part of the traditional region of Lower Carniola and is now included in the Southeast Slovenia Statistical Region.

There is a small 17th-century church in the settlement. It is dedicated to the Holy Spirit and belongs to the Parish of Vinica. The main altar dates to the mid-18th century and was renovated in 1889.

References

External links
Nova Lipa on Geopedia

Populated places in the Municipality of Črnomelj